Chanani or Chenani Assembly constituency is one of the 87 constituencies in the Jammu and Kashmir Legislative Assembly of Jammu and Kashmir a north state of India. Chenani is also part of Udhampur Lok Sabha constituency.

Member of Legislative Assembly

 1962: Amar Nath Sharma, National Conference
 1967: Bhim Singh, Indian National Congress
 1972: Dev Datt, Indian National Congress
 1977: Bhim Singh, Indian National Congress
 1983: Bhim Singh, Independent
 1987: Yash Paul Khajuria, Indian National Congress
 1996: Prithvi Chand, Bharatiya Janata Party
 2002: Faquir Nath, Jammu and Kashmir National Panthers Party
 2008: Krishan Chander Bhagat, Indian National Congress

Election results

2014

See also

 Udhampur district
 List of constituencies of Jammu and Kashmir Legislative Assembly

References

Assembly constituencies of Jammu and Kashmir
Udhampur district